Mark López is a digital media executive, former EVP and General Manager of Univision Interactive Media at Univision Communications   and Head of U.S. Hispanic Audience at Google.

Education
López holds a bachelor's degree from Rensselaer Polytechnic Institute and an MBA from the MIT Sloan School of Management.

Career
López began his career as a senior consultant at Mercer Management Consulting and Andersen Consulting, and then  became the Director of Strategic Alliances at J2 Communications. After working at J2 Communications, López was part of the team that started Terra Networks in the U.S., and was named Chief Operating Officer of Terra Networks USA  in 2007.  He  then  worked for AOL as Publisher of their U.S. Hispanic audience.

In November 2010, he was hired as head of U.S. Hispanic Audience at Google, a new position at the company.

In May 2015, Lopez joined Univision Communications to lead the digital business reporting to Isaac Lee President of Univision Digital. He left Univision Communications in December 2016.

He has served on the board of the IAB and its Multicultural Council and is Board Advisor to the Center of Hispanic Marketing Communications at Florida State University.

References

Living people
Google employees
Rensselaer Polytechnic Institute alumni
MIT Sloan School of Management alumni
Year of birth missing (living people)